The Honda RA099 was a prototype Formula One racecar, commissioned by Honda, designed by ex-Ferrari and Tyrrell designer Harvey Postlethwaite and built by Dallara in 1999. Its purpose was similar to the one surrounding the Toyota TF101 of 2001, in that it was supposed to be a working test car used in preparation for a full-scale assault on Grand Prix racing in the following years.

History

Honda Racing and engine suppliers
Honda Racing had last competed in Formula One as a constructor in the 1960s but had pulled out of the sport, after its driver Jo Schlesser was killed in one of its cars in the 1968 French Grand Prix at Rouen. The company had re-entered Formula One in 1983 as engine supplier to the Spirit team before moving on to have extremely successful partnerships with Williams (1984-1987) and McLaren (1988-1992) as well as less illustrious partnerships with Lotus (1987-1989) and Tyrrell (1991).

After leaving the sport as an engine supplier in 1992, the company worked with Mugen Motorsports to provide engines in F1 for the likes of Lotus, Footwork, Prost (née Ligier) and Jordan but was not directly involved in Formula One itself. An unofficial project by Honda engineers to develop Formula One cars using previous-specification engines also existed during this period.

Proposed return
In 1998, Honda were seriously considering a return to the sport as a constructor, and hired the respected designer Dr. Harvey Postlethwaite, out of work since the demise of Tyrrell that same year, to design a chassis. This he did, and the car, built by Italian company and former F1 constructor in their own right Dallara, tested at Jerez in the hands of Dutch driver Jos Verstappen with some success.

The project was looking promising, with the prototype machine setting competitive midfield times in tests alongside better funded and more established F1 teams. However, the project was aborted indefinitely after Postlethwaite's death from a heart attack at one of the Jerez tests, and the Dallara built tubs were no longer required.

Afterwards
Honda themselves moved back into supplying engines in 2000 with the BAR and Jordan teams, continuing with the former with some success into the middle of the decade. As the partnership grew, the input Honda had with BAR increased and eventually in the wake of the ban on tobacco advertising in Formula One, Honda purchased the BAR team outright and they finally became a constructor again until 2008; Honda withdrew from the sport at the end of the season until they returned as an engine supplier in 2015.

Of the six Dallara RA099 tubs, only four ever saw a race circuit. Currently the whereabouts of only one of those tubs is known, and it is the third one (RA099 3), which is on display at the Honda Collection Hall at Twin Ring Motegi.

References

External links

YouTube video of RA099 chassis at Motegi
TenTenths motorsport, tub locations

Honda Formula One cars
Dallara Formula One cars
Formula One cars that never raced